Studio pottery is pottery made by  professional and  amateur artists or artisans working alone or in small groups, making unique items or short runs. Typically, all stages of manufacture are carried out by the artists themselves.  Studio pottery includes functional wares such as tableware and cookware, and non-functional wares such as sculpture, with vases and bowls covering the middle ground, often being used only for display.  Studio potters can be referred to as ceramic artists, ceramists, ceramicists or as an artist who uses clay as a medium.  

In Britain since the 1980s, there has been a distinct trend away from functional pottery, for example, the work of artist Grayson Perry. Some studio potters now prefer to call themselves ceramic artists, ceramists or simply artists. Studio pottery is represented by potters all over the world and has strong roots in Britain.  Art pottery is a related term, used by many potteries from about the 1870s onwards, in Britain and America; it tends to cover larger workshops, where there is a designer supervising the production of skilled workers who may have input into the pieces made.  The heyday of British and American art pottery was about 1880 to 1940.

Since the second half of the 20th century ceramics has become more highly valued in the art world. There are now several large exhibitions worldwide, including Collect and Origin (formerly the Chelsea crafts fair) in London, International Sculpture Objects & Functional Art Fair (SOFA) Chicago and International Sculpture Objects & Functional Art Fair (SOFA) New York City which includes ceramics as an art form. Ceramics have realized high prices, reaching several thousands of pounds for some pieces, in auctions houses such as Bonhams and Sotheby's.

British studio pottery

Pre-1900

Notable studios included Brannam Pottery, Castle Hedingham Ware, Martin Brothers and Sir Edmund Harry Elton.

1900-1960: Development of contemporary British ceramics

Several influences contributed to the emergence of studio pottery in the early 20th century: art pottery (for example the work of the Martin Brothers and William Moorcroft); the Arts and Crafts movement, the Bauhaus; a rediscovery of traditional artisan pottery and the excavation of large quantities of Song pottery in China.

Leading trends in British studio pottery in the 20th century are represented by Bernard Leach, William Staite Murray, Waistel Cooper, Dora Billington, Lucie Rie and Hans Coper.

Originally trained as a fine artist, Bernard Leach (1887–1979) established a style of pottery, the ethical pot, strongly influenced by Chinese, Korean, Japanese and medieval English forms. After briefly experimenting with earthenware, he turned to stoneware fired to high temperatures in large oil- or wood-burning kilns. This style dominated British studio pottery in the mid-20th century. Leach's influence was disseminated by his writings, in particular A Potter's Book and the apprentice system he ran at his pottery in St Ives, Cornwall, through which many notable studio potters passed. A Potter's Book espoused an anti-industrial, Arts and Crafts ethos, which persists in British studio pottery. Leach taught intermittently at Dartington Hall, Devon from the 1930s.

Other ceramic artists exerted an influence through their positions in art schools. William Staite Murray, who was head of the ceramics department of the Royal College of Art, treated his pots as works of art, exhibiting them with titles in galleries. Dora Billington (1890–1968) studied at Hanley School of Art, worked in the pottery industry and was latterly head of pottery at the Central School of Arts and Crafts. She worked in media that Leach did not, e.g. tin-glazed earthenware, and influenced potters such as William Newland, James Tower, Margaret Hine, Nicholas Vergette and Alan Caiger-Smith.

Lucie Rie (1902–1995) came to London in 1938 as a refugee from Austria. She had studied at the Vienna Kunstgewerbeschule and has been regarded as essentially a modernist. Rie experimented and produced new glaze effects. She was a friend of Leach and was greatly impressed by his approach, especially about the "completeness" of a pot. The bowls and bottles which she specialised in are finely potted and sometimes brightly coloured. She taught at Camberwell College of Arts from 1960 until 1972.

Hans Coper (1920–1981), also a refugee, worked with Rie before moving to a studio in Hertfordshire. His work is non-functional, sculptural and unglazed. He was commissioned to produce large ceramic candlesticks for Coventry Cathedral in the early 1960s. He taught at Camberwell College of Arts from 1960 to 1969, where he influenced Ewen Henderson. He taught at the Royal College of Art from 1966 to 1975, where his students included Elizabeth Fritsch, Alison Britton, Jacqui Poncelet, Carol McNicoll, Geoffrey Swindell, Jill Crowley and Glenys Barton, all of whom produce non-functional work.

After the Second World War, studio pottery in Britain was encouraged by two forces: the wartime ban on decorating manufactured pottery and the modernist spirit of the Festival of Britain. Studio potters provided consumers with an alternative to plain industrial ceramics. Their simple, functional designs chimed in with the modernist ethos. Cranks restaurant, which opened in 1961, used Winchombe pottery throughout, which Tanya Harrod describes as "handsome, functional with pastoral but up to date air". Cranks represented the look of the period. Elizabeth David's food revolution of the post-war years was associated with a similar kitchen look and added to the demand for hand-made tableware.

Harrod notes that several potteries were formed in response to this fifties boom. There was in turn a demand for potters trained in workshop practice and able to throw quickly. As this training was not offered by the art schools of the period, the Harrow Art School studio pottery diploma was created to fill the gap. According to Harrod, "the production potter of the Harrow type had a good innings well into the seventies", by which time the market for this style of pottery was falling away.

1960s-present: Modern British potters 

From the 1960s onwards, a new generation of potters, influenced by Camberwell School of Art and the Central School of Art and Design including Ewen Henderson, Alison Britton, Elizabeth Fritsch, Gordon Baldwin, Ruth Duckworth and Ian Auld began to experiment\abstract ceramic objects, varied surface and glaze effects to critical acclaim. Elizabeth Fritsch has work represented in major collections and museums worldwide.

The number of potters increased in the mid-1970s the Craft Potters Association had 147 members and by the mid-1990s it had 306.

British organisations 
A representative body for studio pottery in the United Kingdom is the Craft Potters Association, which has a members' showroom in Great Russell Street, London WC1, and publishes a journal, Ceramic Review.

US studio pottery 
Pottery had been an integral part of the United States Arts and Crafts movement in the late 19th century and early 20th century. Charles Fergus Binns, who was the first director of the New York State School of Clay-Working and Ceramics at Alfred University, was an important influence. Some potters in the United States adopted the approach from emerging studio pottery movements in Britain and Japan. In addition, American folk pottery of the southeastern United States was seen as an American contribution to studio pottery. University programs at Ohio State University, under the direction of Arthur Eugene Baggs in 1928 and under Glen Lukens in 1936 at the University of Southern California, began training ceramic students in presenting clay ware as art. Baggs had been intimately involved in the Arts and Crafts movement at Marblehead Pottery and, during the 1930s, he revived interest in the salt glazing method for studio pottery.

European artists coming to the United States contributed to the public appreciation of pottery as art, and included Marguerite Wildenhain, Maija Grotell, Susi Singer and Gertrude and Otto Natzler. Significant studio potters in the United States include Otto and Vivika Heino, Warren MacKenzie, Paul Soldner, Peter Voulkos and Beatrice Wood.

US organizations 
 American Ceramic Society; mainly focused on scientific research rather than studio pottery.
 National Council on Education for the Ceramic Arts

Museum studio pottery collections 
Canada
 Gardiner Museum

United Kingdom
 Birmingham Museum & Art Gallery in Birmingham, England
 Sainsbury Centre for Visual Arts at the University of East Anglia in Norwich, England
 Swindon Museum and Art Gallery
 Victoria and Albert Museum in London, England
 York Art Gallery in York

United States of America
 American Museum of Ceramic Art in Pomona, California
 Schein–Joseph International Museum of Ceramic Art, Alfred University, New York
 Scripps College, Ruth Chandler Williamson Gallery The Marer Collection of Contemporary Ceramics in Claremont, California
 University of Michigan Museum of Art in Ann Arbor, Michigan

Australia
National Gallery of Victoria

References

Further reading 
 Cooper, Emmanuel. (2000) Ten thousand years of pottery. London: British Museum Press. 
Crawford, Gail. (2005) Studio Ceramics in Canada, Gardiner Museum of Ceramic Art, Goose Lane Editions.
 Evans, Paul. (1987) Art pottery of the United States: An encyclopedia of producers and their marks, together with a directory of studio potters working in the United States through 1960. New York, N.Y: Feingold & Lewis Pub. Corp. 
 Greenberg, Clement et al., Garth Clark Ed. (2006) Ceramic millennium: Critical writings on ceramic history, theory and art. Halifax, N.S: Press of the Nova Scotia College of Art and Design. 
 Jones, Jeffrey. (2007) Studio pottery in Britain: 1900–2005. London: A & C Black. 
 Lauria, Jo. (2000) Color and fire: defining moments in studio ceramics, 1950-2000: Selections from the Smits collection and related works at the Los Angeles County Museum of Art. Los Angeles, Calif.: LACMA in association with Rizzoli International Publications. 
 Levin, Elaine. (1988) The history of American ceramics, 1607 to the present: From pipkins and bean pots to contemporary forms. New York: H.N. Abrams. 
 Macnaughton, Mary Davis. (1994) Revolution in clay: The Marer collection of contemporary ceramics. Claremont, Calif. Seattle, Wash.: Ruth Chandler Williamson Gallery, Scripps College University of Washington Press. 
 Perry, Barbara Ed. (1989) American ceramics: The collection of Everson Museum of Art. New York Syracuse: Rizzoli The Museum. 
 Watson, Oliver. (1993) Studio pottery. London: Phaidon Victoria and Albert Museum.

External links 

 Ceramic Arts Daily
 Ceramic Review magazine
 Ceramics Monthly
 Contemporary Applied Arts
 Studio Pottery
 Studio Pottery Collectors on Facebook
 The Studio Potter
 V&A Museum studio pottery podcast

 
Arts and Crafts movement
History of ceramics
Crafts
Visual arts media
Ceramic art
Pottery
British pottery
American pottery